Edward Vernon (11 October 1911 – 8 May 1968) was an Australian cricketer. He played ten first-class cricket matches for Victoria between 1933 and 1936.

See also
 List of Victoria first-class cricketers

References

External links
 

1911 births
1968 deaths
Australian cricketers
Victoria cricketers
Cricketers from Melbourne